The men's lightweight event was part of the boxing programme at the 1956 Summer Olympics.  The weight class was allowed boxers of up to 60 kilograms to compete. The competition was held from 23 November to 1 December 1956. 18 boxers from 18 nations competed.

Medalists

Results

First round
 Toshihito Ishimaru (JPN) def. Paddy Donovan (NZL), PTS
 Anatoly Lagetko (URS) def. Francisco Nuñez (ARG), PTS

Second round
 Zygmunt Milewski (POL) def. Pentti Niinivuori (FIN), PTS
 Harry Kurschat (FRG) def. Celedonio Espinosa (PHI), PTS
 Louis Molina (USA) def. William Griffiths (AUS), PTS
 Anthony Byrne (IRL) def. Josef Chovanec (TCH), DSQ-3
 André Vairolatto (FRA) def. Baek Do-seon (KOR), RTD-2
 Richard McTaggart (GBR) def. Chandrasena Jayasuriya (CEY), PTS
 Edward Beattie (CAN) def. Sueb Chundakowsolaya (THA), PTS
 Anatoly Lagetko (URS) def. Toshihito Ishimaru (JPN), PTS

Quarterfinals
 Harry Kurschat (FRG) def. Zygmunt Milewski (POL), RSC-3
 Anthony Byrne (IRL) def. Louis Molina (USA), PTS
 Richard McTaggart (GBR) def. Andre Vairolatto (FRA), PTS
 Anatoly Lagetko (URS) def. Edward Beattie (CAN), PTS

Semifinals
 Harry Kurschat (FRG) def. Anthony Byrne (IRL), PTS
 Richard McTaggart (GBR) def. Anatoly Lagetko (URS), PTS

Final
 Richard McTaggart (GBR) def. Harry Kurschat (FRG), PTS

References

 https://web.archive.org/web/20080912181829/http://www.la84foundation.org/6oic/OfficialReports/1956/OR1956.pdf

Lightweight